3alpha(S)-strictosidine beta-glucosidase is an enzyme with systematic name strictosidine beta-D-glucohydrolase. This enzyme catalyses the following chemical reaction

 strictosidine + H2O  D-glucose + strictosidine aglycone

Thus, the two substrates of this enzyme are strictosidine and H2O, whereas its two products are D-glucose and strictosidine aglycone.

This enzyme belongs to the family of hydrolases, specifically those glycosidases that hydrolyse O- and S-glycosyl compounds. This enzyme participates in indole and ipecac alkaloid biosynthesis.

Strictosidine is a precursor of indole alkaloids.

References

External links 
 

EC 3.2.1